"Religious" is the second single from American R&B singer R. Kelly's studio album, Untitled (2009). The song was released on October 10, 2009, on R. Kelly's YouTube channel. The single was confirmed in R. Kelly's Twitter.

Chart performance

References

2009 singles
R. Kelly songs
Songs written by R. Kelly
Songs written by Tyrese Gibson
Songs written by Warryn Campbell
Song recordings produced by Eric Dawkins & Antonio Dixon
Song recordings produced by R. Kelly
Songs written by Eric Dawkins
Songs written by Antonio Dixon (songwriter)
2009 songs
Jive Records singles